With Shivering Hearts We Wait is Blindside's sixth full-length album.

Track listing
"There Must Be Something in the Water" - 3:58
"My Heart Escapes" - 3:42
"Monster on the Radio" - 3:11
"It's All I Have" - 3:51
"Bloodstained Hollywood Ending" - 3:15
"Our Love Saves Us" - 3:29
"Bring Out Your Dead" - 3:41
"Withering" - 3:35
"Cold" - 3:23
"There Must Be Something in the Wind" - 7:03

Personnel
Christian Lindskog - vocals
Simon Grenehed - guitar
Tomas Näslund - bass
Marcus Dahlström - drums, programming
Joel Dean - co-writer "Our Love Saves Us"

References

2011 albums
Blindside (band) albums